is a passenger railway station located in the city of Matsudo, Chiba Prefecture, Japan, operated by the private railway operator Shin-Keisei Electric Railway.

Lines
Tokiwadaira Station is served by the Shin-Keisei Line, and is located 5.6 kilometers from the terminus of the line at Matsudo Station.

Station layout 
Tokiwadaira Station consists of a single island platform, with an elevated station building.

Platforms

History
Tokiwadaira Station was opened on April 21, 1955 as  It changed its name to its present name on February 1, 1960.

Passenger statistics
In fiscal 2018, the station was used by an average of 18,874 passengers daily.

Surrounding area
Chiba Prefectural West Library
Matsudo Municipal Museum
Chiba West General Hospital
Tokiwadaira Sakura Dori 
Tokiwa Hirakeyaki Dori 
 Matsudo City Hall Tokiwadaira Branch

See also
 List of railway stations in Japan

References

External links

  Shin Keisei Railway Station information

Railway stations in Japan opened in 1955
Railway stations in Chiba Prefecture
Matsudo